The Ford Motor Company Falcon XY GT is a sports sedan based on the Ford Falcon XY. Released in 1970 by Ford Australia, with the GTHO Phase III released in 1971. Some 1,557 units were produced from September 1970 to December 1971 with 300 GTHO Phase IIIs produced from May 1971 to November 1971. It was the fourth in the initial series of the Ford Falcon GT. A limited number were exported to South Africa, wearing Fairmont GT badging. The Fairmont GT model is starting to increase in value as Falcon GTs become harder to find and buyers beginning to see the Fairmont as a genuine GT.

The rev limiter is set to 6,150rpm. The engine type was a 351 Cleveland (carried over from the XW GT/GT-HO Phase II). While Ford stated an output of 300 horsepower, the engine was reputed to produce over 350 horsepower.

Technical details
 Engine specifications:
 Engine: 351 cubic inch Cleveland V8 (5.763 litre)
 OR 351 cubic inch Windsor V8 (5.894 litre)
 Bore and stroke:	
 Power (DIN):	 at 5400rpm (factory claim)
 Torque (DIN:)	515Nm (380 lb-ft) at 3400rpm (factory claim)
 Compression ratio:	11:1
 Configuration:	front mounted, longitudinal, 90 degree V8
 Head design:	pushrod and rocker OHV with solid lifters
 Exhaust system:	cast iron manifold, low restriction twin exhaust
 Fuel system:	600cfm Autolite four-barrel carburettor
 Ignition system:	single point distributor
 Manual gearbox :
 Type: four-speed all-synchronised
 1st: 2.78:1
 2nd: 1.93:1
 3rd: 1.36:1
 4th: 1.00:1
 Reverse: 2.78:1
 Manual gearbox :
 Type: four-speed all-synchronised close ratio
 1st: 2.32:1
 2nd: 1.69:1
 3rd: 1.29:1
 4th: 1.00:1
 Reverse: 2.32:1
 Automatic transmission:
 Type: heavy duty three-speed C6 OR FMX
 Rear axle:
Type: 9-inch LSD traction lock is standard with 28 spline axles or 31 spline optional
 Manual ratio: 3.25:1 standard with optional 3.5:1 or 3.91:1
 Automatic ratio: 2.75:1
 Suspension:
Front: independent ball joint, coil springs, shock absorbers, wishbones and anti-roll bar
Upper control arm to accept the three-pin ball joint used, as opposed to the four-point ball joint used in the normal GTs and earlier GTHOs
 Rear: Hotchkiss type with semi-elliptic leaf springs, shock absorbers and live axle 
 Brakes:
Front:  servo assisted discs
Rear:  servo assisted drums
 Steering:
Type: re-circulating ball power assistance (optional)
 Ratio: 16:1
 Wheels and tyres:
 Wheels: 6.0 x 14 steel - steel "five-slot" with "S" steel dress ring and centre cap
7.0 x 15 alloy - "five-spoke' Bathurst Globe (optional) from 1972
 Tyres: 185 x 14 - E70HR14
 Instrumentation:
 Speedometer: 140mph
 Cleveland tachometer: 8000rpm
 Oil pressure: gauge
 Water temperature: gauge
 Fuel: gauge
 Ignition: warning light
 High beam: warning light
 Brakes: warning light
 Clock: analogue
 Dimensions:
 Length:	
 Width:	
 Height:	
 Weelbase:	
 Front track:	
 Rear track	
 Weight:	1325kg (manual) 1415kg (auto) 
 Turning circle:	
 Fuel tank:	75 litre (16.4 gallons) - 163.8 litre (36.0gl) optional
 Seating:	five
 Performance:
 Top speed:  (auto)

Standing 1/ - 14.4 seconds (manual )

GTHO Phase III
The Ford Falcon GTHO Phase III was built for homologation, looked almost identical to the GT and was a modified version of the Falcon GT built in 1971 with a heavily upgraded engine, a four-speed top-loader gearbox and Detroit locker nine inch differential. It was also equipped with special brakes and handling package, plus a  fuel tank.

Winner of the 1971 Bathurst 500, driven by Allan Moffat, the Phase III has been described as "...simply one of the best cars in the world, a true GT that could take on Ferraris and Astons on their own terms..." by Sports Car World.

Initial cars were equipped with an electrical rev limiter which came into effect at 6,150 rpm. With the rev limiter disabled, the engine was reputed to pull in excess of 7,000 rpm, even in fourth gear. 
At that time the Phase III GTHO was the world's fastest four-door production car.

Performance:

Top speed:  @ 6150rpm  
0 – 60 mph: 6.4 seconds 0 – 100 km - 6.9 seconds
Standing : 14.4 seconds using the standard 3.25:1 Detroit Locker diff ratio.
An optional 3.9:1 ratio differential was available and reputedly enabled such cars to cover the 1/4 mile in 13.9 seconds.

Bathurst 
(6,172 km: 1938-1986) (6,213 km: 1987–present) fastest lap time: 2:36.5 by Allan Moffat (1972 Hardie-Ferodo 500 - Ford Falcon XY GTHO Phase III)

Value 
The Phase III GTHO is in incredibly high demand with collectors and investors. Good examples have been sold for prices in excess of A$1,000,000, including a car once owned by Australian cricketer Jeff Thomson. Lloyds Auctions sold the pristine and provenanced car for $1,030,000 at its weekend auction in Bathurst, NSW. This demand is, in part, due to a small production run, and 'fewer than 100 remaining' examples of the GTHO.

A Falcon XY GTHO Phase III was sold at by Bonhams & Goodmans at auction for A$683,650 in March 2007. The car had only 40,000 km on the clock. The buyer of the car said it will be garaged, and that it will not be driven, but that he will be "keeping it as an investment". The sale price set a new auction record for Australian sport sedans. Whilst in June 2007 another Phase III sold for A$750,000.

Race record
The Falcon GTHO Phase III succeeded in an outright win at Bathurst in the 1971 Hardie-Ferodo 500 and also secured the 1973 Australian Touring Car Championship (ATCC) title; in both instances the cars were driven by Allan Moffat.

Ian "Pete" Geoghegan and Moffat had great success with the Phase III in Australian production touring car racing where it scored many race wins from the latter half of 1971 through to 1973. One of the Phase IIIs driven by Moffat is now owned by Bowden's Own, an Australian car care products company.
 This particular example was a replacement vehicle fettled in September 1972, the original 1971 Bathurst winning car having been badly damaged at Adelaide International Raceway in the opening round of the 1972 Australian Manufacturers Championship; this particular GTHO was subsequently driven to a number of victories by Moffat and enabled him to secure the overall 1973 ATCC honours.

In 1970, the Ford Works Team under the direction of team manager Al Turner, built two "Super Falcons" using the XW GTHO Phase II as the basis for the cars. Ford looked to translate the work that had gone into the Ford Mustang Boss 302 into the local Falcon model with the car using a fuel injected and much higher developed  Cleveland V8 engine. According to those who drove the cars (Alan Moffat, Ian Geoghegan and John French), the Super Falcon's biggest problem was that the  the engine produced was simply too much for the light weight chassis to handle and power oversteer was the order of the day. Turner initially did not believe Moffat when he told him this, believing that the car was simply being driven wrong. At the Mallala Circuit in South Australia, Moffat took Turner for a lap of the circuit in his Falcon in a successful bid to show the team boss what the car was really like to drive.

Moffat virtually abandoned the Super Falcon in the 1971 and 1972 ATCCs (which by this time had been upgraded with XY bodywork) in favour of his better handling Boss 302 Mustang. In 1972, Geoghegan went the opposite way and abandoned his own well developed Ford Mustang GTA to drive his Falcon. After fixing the problem with the chassis, Geoghegan was able to get the best out of the car and won a memorable third round of the 1972 ATCC at the Mount Panorama Circuit after a long race with the Mustang of Moffat. The race is often seen as the best in the ATCC's history.

1st 1971 Hardie-Ferodo 500 at Mount Panorama
1st 1971 Australian Manufacturers' Championship, round five at Surfers Paradise
1st 1972 South Pacific Touring Series
1st 1972 Australian Touring Car Championship, round three, Mount Panorama
1st 1972 Australian Manufacturers' Championship, round two, Sandown Park (1972 Sandown 250)
1st 1972 Australian Manufacturers' Championship, round four, Phillip Island
1st 1972 Australian Manufacturers' Championship, round five, Surfers Paradise
1st 1973 Australian Touring Car Championship, round one, Symmons Plains
1st 1973 Australian Touring Car Championship, round two, Calder Park
1st 1973 Australian Touring Car Championship, round three, Sandown Park
1st 1973 Australian Touring Car Championship, round four, Wanneroo Park
1st 1973 Australian Touring Car Championship, round seven, Oran Park

Successor to the GTHO Phase III
In 1972, the XY series Falcon was replaced by the XA Falcon range. Production of approximately 200 XA-based Falcon GT-HO Phase IV cars was originally scheduled to take place in June and July 1972, but this was terminated at 'the eleventh hour' due to what became known as "the supercar scare". The Sun-Herald newspaper had run this as a front-page lead article (with banner headline in large capital letters) on Sunday 25 June 1972: "160mph 'super cars' soon". A copy of that front page is shown at the start of a Phase IV documentary.

Only one road vehicle had been completed when production was cancelled. Three standard GTs were being converted into GT-HOs by the Ford factory race team for the Sandown 500 in September and Bathurst 500 in October 1972. Only one of these racers was ever completed and the other two were finished after being sold or given to specific individuals or dealers by Ford Australia. The Phase IV was never officially released.

Recently one of three Phase 4 protypes manufactured by Ford Special vehicles to compete at Bathurst 1972 was sold for $1,750.000 a world record price after spending over 20 years with its previous collector owner Paul Carthew

References

External links
The Falcon XY GT Club
Falcon GT Club
www.gtho4.com
Supercars.net forum
http://www.autocar.co.uk/car-news/new-cars/picture-special-history-maserati-quattroporte

1970s cars
Cars of Australia
GT XY
Sports sedans
Rear-wheel-drive vehicles
Cars introduced in 1971
Muscle cars